A by-election was held in the Tasmanian Legislative Council division of Pembroke on 4 November 2017. It was triggered by the resignation of sitting member Vanessa Goodwin, who was diagnosed with brain cancer.

Background
The electoral division of Pembroke is located on the eastern shore of the River Derwent in Hobart.

Vanessa Goodwin, a member of the Liberal Party, was elected on 1 August 2009 at a by-election to replace Labor member Allison Ritchie who had resigned. When the Liberals won government in 2014, Goodwin was appointed as Attorney-General, Minister for Justice, Minister for Corrections and Minister for the Arts.

On 25 March 2017, Goodwin was hospitalised with multiple brain tumours. On 6 April, Premier Will Hodgman informed the parliament that she was not expected to recover. Goodwin resigned on 2 October 2017.

Results

References

External links
Pembroke By-election (Tasmanian Electoral Commission)

2017 elections in Australia
Tasmania state by-elections